Dąbrowa Górnicza railway station is a railway station in Dąbrowa Górnicza, Poland. As of 2012, it is served by Przewozy Regionalne (local and InterRegio services) and PKP Intercity (TLK services). InterRegio and TLK services are on the line between Warsaw and Katowice.

Train services

The station is served by the following services:

Intercity services (IC) Olsztyn - Warszawa - Skierniewice - Częstochowa - Katowice - Bielsko-Biała
Intercity services (IC) Olsztyn - Warszawa - Skierniewice - Częstochowa - Katowice - Gliwice - Racibórz

References

External links 
 

Railway stations in Silesian Voivodeship
Railway stations served by Przewozy Regionalne InterRegio
Railway station
Railway stations served by Koleje Śląskie